Ki-moon, also spelled Gi-mun, is a Korean masculine given name. Its meaning differs based on the hanja used to write each syllable of the name. There are 68 hanja with the reading "ki" and 14 hanja with the reading "moon" on the South Korean government's official list of hanja which may be registered for use in given names. Ways of writing this name in hanja include:
 ( teo gi,  geulwol mun); these are also used for the Japanese name Motofumi 

People with this name include:
Ban Ki-moon (born 1944), South Korean diplomat, eighth Secretary General of the United Nations
Kim Kimoon (born 1954), South Korean chemist
Kang Gi-mun, South Korean politician; see List of members of the South Korean Constituent Assembly, 1948–50

See also
List of Korean given names

References

Korean masculine given names